Fisichella is an Italian noble family, forming part of the Sicilian nobility.
Members of the family include multiple judges and prelates, among them a justice of the Supreme Court of the Kingdom of Sicily and an archbishop of the Roman Catholic Church.

History 

The House of Fisichella, originally from the Val di Catania, has long been prominent in the fields of diplomacy, jurisprudence, philosophy and theology.

Among the family's forefathers, at the beginning of the 17th century Domenico Fisichella was chaplain at the monasterium album of Campanarazzu, Misterbianco, and later at the local St. Nicholas Church, while Francesco Fisichella was ambassador of the city of Catania to the royal court of Madrid since 1671.

In the 18th century, two renowned members of the family were both named Giuseppe Fisichella: the elder was referred to as signore don around 1718, whereas the younger, namely Giuseppe Maria Fisichella, served as justice of the Supreme Court of the Kingdom of Sicily in the years 1770, 1771, 1772 and 1782.

Among his nephews, in the 19th century a namesake was giudice circondariale – that is commissioner and judge – of Centorbi and Mascali, in 1826 and 1830, respectively, while Ignazio Fisichella was Deputy Secretary of the General Prosecution Office of the Kingdom of Italy at the Catania Appeal Court, and later Clerk to the civil and criminal court of Nicosia.

In the 20th century, two cadet branches branched off from the main line, whose family seat is located in Militello in Val di Catania, moving to Lombardy and Lazio, respectively; the first is represented by Rino Fisichella (born 1951), academic, theologian and archbishop of the Roman Catholic Church, while the second by Giancarlo Fisichella (born 1973), famous athlete.

Onomastics

In popular culture 

Notes and references

Notes

References

Bibliography

Heraldic literature

Non-fiction

Historical fiction

Chronicle

See also 
 Fisichella (surname)

External links